Jongleurs may refer to:

Jongleur, another word for a medieval minstrel
Jongleurs (comedy club)